Odelsk is an Agrotown located in Grodno District in Grodno Region, Belarus and the capital of the Odelsky Rural Council. Its population is estimated at 661 inhabitants.

History
Within the Grand Duchy of Lithuania, Odelsk was part of Trakai Voivodeship. In 1795, Odelsk was annexed by the Kingdom of Prussia in the course of the Third Partition of Poland and it became a part of New East Prussia. In 1807, the Treaties of Tilsit transferred Odelsk to the Russian Empire. Odelsk became a part of Grodno Governorate.

On 18 March 1921, the Peace of Riga between Poland on the one hand and Soviet Russia and Soviet Ukraine on the other hand defined Odelsk as a part of Poland.

In September 1939, the Red Army occupied Odelsk in the course of the Soviet invasion of Poland. On 14 November 1939, the Supreme Soviet of the Soviet Union incorporated Western Belorussia, including Odelsk, into the Byelorussian Soviet Socialist Republic. On 4 December 1939, Odelsk became a part of the newly created Belastok Region.
 
During the Soviet occupation of Eastern Poland The Soviets deported the Marcinowicz family and the Budrewicz family. In 1941, During the German occupation, the active organizer of the underground cells in the commune was Władysław Szupicki, the post manager in Sokółka. During the retreat, the Germans looked for hills and places convenient to stop the advancing Soviets and took people from nearby villages to dig trenches. For this purpose, they brought the inhabitants on trucks to the Indura area, near the village of Likówka. When a crowd of people got out of the vehicles, they were caught in massive fire from Soviet artillery, which killed over 70 people.

After the war
After the war, the village was included in the Byelorussian Soviet Socialist Republic, even though the Cruzone Line passed two kilometers east of the village, according to locals because the village contained few stone structures, which the Soviets wished to have for their use.

After the incorporation into the Byelorussian Soviet Socialist Republic, a group of 200 people fled to Poland. The others would be imprisoned for 25 years. After Stalin's death, everyone was released, and many went to Poland, although they were also under surveillance in their home country. In 1951, the boys escaped to the shelters from conscription to the Soviet Army. They were captured and convicted and imprisoned for 5–10 years. In the 1950s, nearly 100 of the town's 1000 inhabitants were in prison.

References

External links

Populated places in Grodno Region
Trakai Voivodeship
Sokolsky Uyezd
Białystok Voivodeship (1919–1939)
Belastok Region
Shtetls
Holocaust locations in Belarus